Chase the Cat is the thirteenth studio album by American rapper Too Short. It was released on November 20, 2001, through Jive Records. The album found moderate success, peaking at #71 on the Billboard 200 and #14 on the Top R&B/Hip-Hop Albums chart.

Track listing

Personnel
  MC Breed - Performer
  Torrance - Scott Guitar
  Scarface - Vocals
  Spearhead X - Drum Programming, Keyboards
  Taj "Mahal" Tilghman - Keyboards, Producer, Engineer, Drum Programming
  Erick Sermon - Performer
  Joan of Arc - Vocals
  Daz Dillinger - Producer, Vocals
  G Fabulous - Illustrations
  Quint Black - Drum Programming, Keyboards
  Todd Shaw - Executive Producer, Producer
  Shorty B. - Drum Programming, Guitar, Vocals, Keyboards
  Marc Regan - Mastering
  Jay Mac - Drum Programming, Guitar, Keyboards
  Todd A. Shaw - Main Performer, Vocals
  Trick Daddy - Vocals
  Michelle Lynn Forbes - Engineer
  Tha Eastsidaz - Performer
  Butch Cassidy - Vocals
  Baby DC - Performer
  Asif Ali - Engineer
  Yaku Allen - Engineer, Producer
  Ax - Vocals
  Tone Capone - Drums, Producer, Keyboards
  Robin Mays - Engineer
  Kokane - Performer
  Ant Banks - Drums, Engineer, Mixing, Producer, Keyboards
  Harm - Vocals
  Meech Wells - Drum Programming, Producer, Keyboards
  L-Roc - Drum Programming, Keyboards
  Xavier Hargrove - Engineer

Charts

References

Too Short albums
2001 albums
Albums produced by Ant Banks
Albums produced by Jazze Pha
Jive Records albums